Korn Khunatipapisiri (also known as Oaujun, born 13 November 1993) is a Thai actor and dancer. He is best known for his roles in the film Love's Coming (2014) and television series Ugly Duckling Series: Boy's Paradise (2015).

Early life and education 
Korn was born on November 13, 1993 in Khon Kaen, Thailand. He is the youngest son of three siblings. He is currently studying in Srinakharinwirot University.

Career

Dancer
Korn is a famous dancer and a member of the Thai dancer group Station5. He performed in more than 100 stage concerts.

Acting career
Korn began his career in the entertainment industry as a model and actor before he signed up with GMMTV. He made his acting debut with the film Rose – Last love in 2013.

In 2014, he got the main role in the BL film Love's Coming, portraying the role of Zee. In 2015, he starred in a Thai romance series Ugly Duckling Series: Boy's Paradise, where he played the main role. The same year, he portrayed the role of Earth in the series Wifi Society: Gray Secret.

In 2016, he starred in supporting roles in the LGBT drama SOTUS where he played the role of Tew and in the romantic drama Lovey Dovey. In 2017, he starred a supporting in the television series Slam Dance: The Series.

In 2017, he continued playing the supporting role of Tew in the sequel to SOTUS, SOTUS S and in an episode of the spin-off Our Skyy.

Filmography

Movie

Television series

References

External links 

Asian Fuse Profile

1994 births
Living people
Korn Khunatipapisiri
Korn Khunatipapisiri
Korn Khunatipapisiri
Korn Khunatipapisiri
Korn Khunatipapisiri